Jakov Kitarović (born 4 October 1968) is a Croatian engineer who is the husband of Kolinda Grabar-Kitarović, the 4th President of Croatia from 2015 to 2020, who was narrowly elected to office in the January 2015 presidential election by defeating the 3rd president Ivo Josipović. As a result, he succeeded Tatjana Josipović as First Spouse and is the first man in the role, as well as the youngest to date, aged 46 at the time.

Early life
He was born in Rijeka, on 4 October 1968 as the son of Ivo Kitarović, a professor at the Faculty of Maritime Studies of the University of Rijeka, who is originally from Šibenik.

Kitarović graduated from the Faculty of Electrical Engineering and Computing of the University of Zagreb in 1998 and also has a degree in nautical engineering from the Faculty of Maritime Studies of the University of Rijeka.

Private life
Jakov Kitarović married Kolinda Grabar in 1996 and they have two children. Following his wife's election to the presidency, he worked in a Zagreb-based software firm, Reversing Labs and later took up a position as a corporate security consultant in AD Plastik, the largest Croatian manufacturer of plastic parts for the car industry.

References

1968 births
Living people
Scientists from Rijeka
Spouses of presidents of Croatia
University of Rijeka alumni
University of Zagreb alumni
20th-century Croatian women
21st-century Croatian women